The 2022 Lafayette Leopards football team represented Lafayette College as a member of the Patriot League during the 2022 NCAA Division I FCS football season. The Leopards, led by first-year head coach John Troxell, played their home games at Fisher Stadium.

Schedule

References

Lafayette
Lafayette Leopards football seasons
Lafayette Leopards football